Kinyerezi I Thermal Power Station, also Kinyerezi 1 Thermal Power Station or Kinyerezi 1 Gas Plant,  is a , natural gas powered, electricity generating power station in Tanzania.

Location
The power-plant is located in Kinyerezi Ward, in Ilala District, in Dar es Salaam, the commercial capital and largest city in Tanzania. The plant lies adjacent to the  gas-fired power station, Kinyerezi II Thermal Power Station. The geographical coordinates of Kinyerezi 1 Power Station are: 06°51'30.0"S, 39°09'18.0"E (Latitude:-6.858333; Longitude:39.155000).

Overview
Kinyerezi I Power Station is owned and operated by Tanesco, the Tanzanian electricity generation and distribution company. It was constructed by Jacobsen Elektro of Norway. The plant began producing 70 megawatts of electricity on 13 October 2015, and full production of 150 megawatts began on 31 March 2016. The power generated is evacuated via 220kV high-voltage cables to a nearby substation, where it is integrated into the Tanzanian national electricity grid. The power plant operates on either natural gas or jet fuel.

The power station has installed capacity of 150 megawatts, consisting two LM6000pf 40 megawatts turbines and two LM6000pf 35 megawatts turbines, all manufactured by General Electric of the United States.

Future plans
While Kinyerezi I's capacity is being increased to 335 megawatts by February 2019, the government of Tanzania is also in process of expanding Kinyerezi II to the full 240 megawatts.

See also
Tanzania Electric Supply Company Limited 
List of power stations in Tanzania
Economy of Tanzania

References

External links
Website of Tanesco

Power stations in Tanzania
Dar es Salaam
Energy infrastructure completed in 2016
2016 establishments in Tanzania